Hacienda Heights is an unincorporated suburban community  in Los Angeles County, California, United States. As of the 2010 census, the community had a total population of 54,038, up from 53,122 at the 2000 census. For statistical purposes, the Census Bureau has defined Hacienda Heights as a census designated place (CDP). It is the second largest CDP in Los Angeles County by area, behind Topanga, and the county's fourth largest CDP by population.

History
Hacienda Heights sits on land that was originally part of Rancho La Puente.
During Spanish rule, the land around Hacienda Heights was operated by the nearby Mission San Gabriel Arcángel in San Gabriel. The Rancho was eventually acquired by John A. Rowland and William Workman in 1845 via a Mexican land grant, and eventually acquired by Elias "Lucky" Baldwin in the mid-1870s. In 1912, his descendant, Anita Baldwin, sold the property to Edwin Hart and Jet Torrance. In 1913 the pair subdivided the area and named it North Whittier Heights, which became known for avocado, citrus and walnut orchards. However, from the Great Depression era to the early 1940s, citrus growing became unprofitable because of pests and diseases, setting the impetus for the area's transformation into a suburb.

Accelerating in the 1950s, suburban residential development transformed Hacienda Heights into a residential or bedroom community. In 1961, the Hacienda Heights Branch of the Los Angeles County Public Library opened. The following year, in 1961, the area was renamed Hacienda Heights. In 1964, the local newspaper, the Hacienda Heights Highlander, was established.

The hills surrounding Hacienda Heights have a history of brush fires, especially in 1978, 1989, and 2020.

Geography
Hacienda Heights is in the eastern San Gabriel Valley bordering City of Industry to the North, Whittier to the West, La Habra Heights to the South, and Rowland Heights to the East along the Pomona Freeway - Route 60. Hacienda Heights is a predominantly residential neighborhood.

Hacienda Heights also has the Puente Hills forming its 'green belt' southern border and much of its western border. Coyotes are common concern among residents.

Demographics

2010
The 2010 United States Census reported that Hacienda Heights had a population of 54,038. The racial makeup of Hacienda Heights was 38% White (12.6% Non-Hispanic White), 1.1% African American, 0.3% Native American, 39.3% Asian, 0.3% Pacific Islander, and 2.8% from two or more races. Hispanic or Latino of any race were 46%.

The census reported that 53,928 people (99.8% of the population) lived in households, 70 (0.1%) lived in non-institutionalized group quarters, and 40 (0.1%) were institutionalized.

There were 16,193 households, out of which 6,185 (38.2%) had children under the age of 18 living in them, 10,151 (62.7%) were opposite-sex married couples living together, 2,331 (14.4%) had a female householder with no husband present, 1,024 (6.3%) had a male householder with no wife present.  There were 555 (3.4%) unmarried opposite-sex partnerships, and 93 (0.6%) same-sex married couples or partnerships. 2,111 households (13.0%) were made up of individuals, and 1,047 (6.5%) had someone living alone who was 65 years of age or older. The average household size was 3.33.  There were 13,506 families (83.4% of all households); the average family size was 3.59.

The CDP population contained 11,864 people (22.0%) under the age of 18, 5,184 people (9.6%) aged 18 to 24, 13,597 people (25.2%) aged 25 to 44, 15,071 people (27.9%) aged 45 to 64, and 8,322 people (15.4%) who were 65 years of age or older.  The median age was 40.1 years. For every 100 females there were 94.8 males.  For every 100 females age 18 and over, there were 92.4 males.

The homeowner vacancy rate was 1.0%; the rental vacancy rate was 3.6%.  42,189 people (78.1% of the population) lived in owner-occupied housing units and 11,739 people (21.7%) lived in rental housing units. Median value of owner-occupied housing units, 2013-2017 was $545,400 with medium gross rent of $1,734.

Landmarks 
West of Hacienda Heights is the former Puente Hills Landfill, which was at one time the largest landfill in the U.S. until its closure in 2013. It is now used as a gas-to-energy facility, as well as part of the Puente Hills Habitat Authority.

The "Puente Hills Landfill Native Habitat Preservation Authority" supports public enjoyment and access of the nearby parkland in the Puente Hills. Some of the hiking trails they offer are Hacienda Hills, Sycamore Canyon, Turnbull Canyon and Hellman Park.

Hsi Lai Temple 
Hsi Lai Temple (meaning "Coming West"), a branch of Fo Guang Shan of Taiwan, is the largest Buddhist temple in North America. The temple's Ming dynasty (1368–1644 AD) and Qing dynasty (1644–1911 AD) architecture is faithful to the traditional style of buildings, Chinese gardens, and statuary of ancient Chinese monasteries. Hsi Lai was built to serve as a spiritual and cultural center for Buddhism and Chinese culture.

Government

Representation

Services
The Los Angeles County Sheriff's Department operates the Industry Station in the City of Industry, serving Hacienda Heights.

The Los Angeles County Department of Health Services operates the Pomona Health Center in Pomona, serving Hacienda Heights.

Cityhood
In 2003, voters were asked to decide whether the community should incorporate and become a city. Proponents argued that a new city would be able to better control development and provide increased police and fire service, while opponents argued that the new city would increase taxes and redevelop residential neighborhoods for revenue-generating businesses. Most of the prime commercial land had already been annexed by the City of Industry to escape taxes levied by the County on unincorporated areas. Ultimately the measure failed by about a 2-1 margin.

Education
The city is served by the Hacienda La Puente Unified School District.

High schools
 Los Altos High School
 Glen A. Wilson High School
 Valley Alternative High School

Middle schools
Newton Middle School
Orange Grove Middle School
Cedarlane Academy

K-8 schools
 Mesa Robles School
 Cedarlane Academy
 St. Marks Lutheran School

Elementary schools
 Bixby Elementary
 Grazide Elementary
 Kwis Elementary
 Los Altos Elementary
 Los Molinos Elementary
 Los Robles Academy
 Palm Elementary
 Wedgeworth Elementary
 Hillgrove Elementary at 1234 Valencia Ave (1953-1984)
Glenelder Elementary School was merged with Cedarlane and Shadybend was closed down, too.

Notable people

Caprice Bourret, actress and model
Ralph Brown, football player
William Campbell, California state legislator
Shaun Cody, football player
Andy DeMize, rock musician
Fergie, singer and actress
Jeff Garcia, voice actor and comedian
Rob Hertel, football player
Gary Jones, former national champion motocross racer
Josh Keaton, actor and singer, The Spectacular Spider-Man
Dong Kim, neurosurgeon
David Lee, photographer and film director, Publisher of Destination Luxury
Esperanza Martinez, painter
Sona Movsesian, executive assistant and television personality
Shane del Rosario, MMA fighter
Ryan Sakoda, professional wrestler
Michael Smith, former All-America basketball player at BYU and first-round pick of the Boston Celtics (13th overall), current television and color announcer for Los Angeles Clippers
Jill Sterkel, 2-time Olympic champion freestyle swimmer
Kevin Song, professional poker player
Troy Tanner, professional volleyball player
Brian Tee, actor
Scott Williams, professional NBA basketball player
Marc Yu, child musician

Community Events
Since 1966, St. John Vianney Catholic Church in Hacienda Heights has hosted a carnival event called "Early California Days", (also known as 'Harvest in the Heights') usually held for a week each summer. The festivities consists of rides, games, food, music and a grand raffle with cash prizes.

Since the 1970s, there has been an annual football derby between rival high schools, Los Altos and Glen A. Wilson for control of a trophy that resembles a wagon wheel.

See also
Rowland Heights, neighboring community immediately adjacent to Hacienda Heights on the east.

References

External links
 Puente Hills Preserve Park - activities and homepage
 Regional Chamber of Commerce - San Gabriel Valley
 Hacienda Heights Improvement Association

 
Communities in the San Gabriel Valley
Census-designated places in Los Angeles County, California
Puente Hills
1913 establishments in California